(1516-?1592) is distinguished as the first generation in the Raku family line of potters. According to historical documents he was the son of one Ameya, who is said to have emigrated to Japan from Korea (or possibly Ming China, as asserted on the RAKU WARE website (link below) of the still active line of potters founded by Chojiro). Historical evidence shows that he produced ridge tiles for Toyotomi Hideyoshi's Jurakudai palace in 1574. There is a historical document reporting that in 1584, Toyotomi Hideyoshi presented him with a seal inscribed with the character 楽, raku, and with this "Raku" was adopted as the family name. He worked at one time for Sen no Rikyū, the master of tea, at whose request he created teabowls to be used in chanoyu, the Japanese tea ceremony. Extant records of the use, at the time, of the tea bowls that he produced for Rikyū describe them as "tea bowls of the Sōeki form", Sōeki being the name that Rikyū was then generally known by.   The bowls attracted attention for their beauty and refinement.  Chōjirō produced bowls that were either entirely red or entirely black glazed soft pottery, simple and without decoration, which were meant to reflect wabi ideals.

Chōjirō's adopted son, Jōkei, followed in his father's footsteps, and was allowed to append the term raku to his name in recognition of his talents.  This marked the beginning of the use of the style in Japanese pottery.

References

External links
 Official homepage of the Raku family and its ceramic tradition
 An entry on Tanaka Chojiro from the Encyclopædia Britannica

Japanese potters
1592 deaths
Year of birth unknown